The title of Chief Justice of the Northern Territory refers to the highest judicial position in the Supreme Court of the Northern Territory.  The position is currently held by Michael Grant.

History of the Chief Justice of the Northern Territory
The Supreme Court of the Northern Territory was established in 1911.  From 1911–1974 the Northern Territory had only one resident judge.  Relief was provided by Commonwealth judges from 1961 to 1976, and by Federal Court judges from 1976 to 1978.  The Northern Territory gained Self-Government in 1978 and by that time had four resident judges.

The title given to the judge varied in name, as the laws concerning the position varied.  In 1975 the position was renamed to Chief Judge, with Sir William Forster the only person to hold that position, from 1977–1979.  Forster uniquely held 3 different titles relating to the same position, that of Senior Judge, Chief Judge and Chief Justice, when the position title was changed again in 1979.  Since that time there have been 6 Chief Justices of the Court.  From 1911–1974, there were eight resident judges (not including Forster).

List of resident and senior judges of the Northern Territory
The Hon. Samuel James Mitchell 1911–1912
The Hon. David John Davies Bevan 1912–1920
The Hon. Donald Arthur Roberts 1921–1928
The Hon. Ross Ibbotson Dalton Mallam 1928–1933
The Hon. Thomas Alexander Wells 1933–1952
The Hon. Martin Chemnitz Kriewaldt 1952–1960
The Hon. Alan Bruce Keith Ian Bridge 1961–1966
The Hon. Sir Richard Arthur Blackburn OBE (Mil) 1966–1971
The Hon. Sir William Edward Stanley Forster 1971–1977

List of chief judges of the Northern Territory
The Hon. Sir William Edward Stanley Forster 1977–1979

List of chief justices of the Northern Territory
The Hon. Sir William Edward Stanley Forster 1979–1985
The Hon. Kevin Frederick O'Leary 1985–1987
The Hon. Keith John Austin Asche AC 1987–1993
The Hon. Brian Frank Martin AO MBE 1993–2003
The Hon. Brian Ross Martin 2004–2010
The Hon. Trevor Riley 2010–2016
The Hon. Michael Grant AO 2016–present

References

External links
 Northern Territory Government – About the Supreme Court
 New Northern Territory Chief Justice named. ABC News.

 
Lists of judges of Australian superior courts